Jaimes Anthony McKee (born 14 April 1987) is a former professional footballer who played as a forward or winger. He is currently the assistant coach of Hong Kong U-23.

He was the top scorer of the Hong Kong Senior Shield in the 2006–07 season and the top scorer of the Hong Kong First Division in the 2012–13 season. Born in England, he was raised mainly in Hong Kong and was selected 53 times for the Hong Kong national football team between 2012 and 2019. He is the grandson of former Birmingham City footballer Frank McKee.

Early life
McKee was born on 14 July 1987 in Birmingham, England. He moved to Dubai with his family when he was 2 years old. McKee's family then moved to Hong Kong in 1997 where he began playing football. McKee studied at King George V School in Hong Kong and played in the inter-school football competition of the Hong Kong Schools Sports Federation.

Club career

HKFC
McKee started his senior career with the Hong Kong Football Club. He scored his first senior goal for the club against Eastern in the 80th minute on 16 October 2005. Even though during his first season he wasn't a regular first team forward, he scored an impressive 19 goals in 18 games in the second division league. McKee scored two hat-tricks during his first season, once against Korchina on 13 November 2005 and another against Kwok Keung on 12 February 2006.

During the 2006–07 Hong Kong First Division League season, McKee scored two goals for the Hong Kong Football Club against league winners South China. McKee was selected by Casemiro Mior for Hong Kong League XI after this incredible performance. He is the youngest player ever and the first Hong Kong FC player to be called up for the selection team. However, McKee was injured before the 2007 Lunar New Year Cup, and Ivan Jević replaced him.

Along with Hong Kong Football Club's relegation, McKee was pursued by Sun Hei. However, he joined Kitchee in 2007, saying it might be difficult to start in such a large club.

Kitchee
McKee made his Kitchee debut on 16 September 2007 in a 2–2 first division league draw with Eastern. He came off the bench on the 71st-minute for Cheung Kin Fung. McKee's first goal for Kitchee in the league match was against the Hong Kong Rangers at the Mong Kok Stadium on 14 October 2007. He was predominantly a substitute player for Kitchee during this time. However, in the league game against Wofoo Tai Po on 12 April 2008, he made a comeback by scoring two goals.

McKee got off to a great start of the season by scoring in the 12th minute against a new club TSW Pegasus on 7 September 2008.
He established himself as a regular first team player before the game against Sun Hei on 7 October 2008. However, he was not the main player for Kitchee during his studies at the University of Hong Kong, even he scored two goals surprisingly as a substitute player and led Kitchee 3–2 defeat Happy Valley on 15 March 2008.

Back to HKFC
McKee returned to the Hong Kong Football Club in 2010-11 season as the club was promoted to first division. As a result, the team became semi-professional. He did not make an appearance in the opening game of the Hong Kong FC, but his name appeared on the players list of the Hong Kong FC in the match against TSW Pegasus on 10 September 2010.

He scored his first goal after returning to the Hong Kong FC in the league match against Citizen on 23 October 2010, but Hong Kong FC could not defeat Citizen.

The Hong Kong Football Club was relegated to the lowest position in 2010–11 Hong Kong First Division League, but TSW Pegasus admired McKee's performance and invited him to join the team. In early June 2011, McKee's former club Kitchee and last season's Hong Kong First Division League champions, made an agreement with McKee, However they decided instead to contract a foreign player. McKee finally appeared on the team member list of TSW Pegasus.

Pegasus

McKee played as start-up player for TSW Pegasus in the team's first league game of the 2011-12 season. He scored his first goal of the season in the match against Hong Kong Sapling as a substitute for Leandro Carrijo in the 15th minute.

In the first round of the 2011–12 Hong Kong Senior Challenge Shield against his former club Kitchee, McKee scored twice and led TSW Pegasus to a 2–1 win. On 23 October 2011, McKee scored in a 2–3 loss against Kitchee at the Tseung Kwan O, meaning he has scored in every match against his old club.

On 25 February 2012, McKee responded with a spectacular brace in the extra-time of the quarter-final match against Sham Shui Po in League Cup. McKee scored a hat-trick and TSW Pegasus won the game. In the quarter-final match on 11 March, McKee scored twice against Citizen and his team won 4–1.

On the final day of the 2012-13 Hong Kong First Division League season, McKee scored five goals against Biu Chun Rangers to take his tally to 16 goals and top of the scoring chart.

Eastern
On 6 July 2016, McKee signed a two-year contract with Eastern. He appeared in 16 league games in his first season, scoring 4 goals. He announcement his retirement from football on 16 July 2019.

International career

McKee held a British passport but his permanent residency in Hong Kong has now allowed him to become a Hong Kong passport holder. He is able to represent the Hong Kong national football team.

On 2 December 2011, McKee was called up by caretaker Hong Kong coach Liu Chun Fai for the Hong Kong national football team to play against Guangdong in the 2012 Guangdong-Hong Kong Cup. McKee played as start-up right winger in the second leg of the Cup on 1 January 2012 and Hong Kong team won the 2012 Guangdong-Hong Kong Cup through penalty shootout.

On 14 November 2012, Mckee made his international debut against Malaysia in which Hong Kong drew by 1:1.

On 1 January 2014, Mckee scored his first goal for the Hong Kong national football team in the second leg of Guangdong-Hong Kong Cup. On 13 November 2014, McKee scored his first international goal against North Korea in which Hong Kong lost by 1:2.

McKee scored a brace for Hong Kong against Bhutan on 11 June 2015 in a 2018 FIFA World Cup qualifier.

In June 2016, since the absence of captain Chan Wai Ho, vice-captain Yapp Hung Fai and Lee Chi Ho, McKee have served as Hong Kong captain during 2016 AYA Bank Cup.

On 11 June 2019, McKee made his last international appearance for Hong Kong in a friendly against Chinese Taipei.

Career statistics

Club
As of 19 May 2019

International

International goals
As of match played 10 October 2017. Hong score listed first, score column indicates score after each McKee goal.

Honours
HKFC
Hong Kong Second Division: 2005–06

Pegasus
 Hong Kong FA Cup: 2015–16

Individual
 Hong Kong First Division Golden Boot: 2012–13
 Hong Kong Second Division Golden Boot: 2005–06

References

External links

Jaimes McKee at HKFA

1987 births
Living people
Footballers from Birmingham, West Midlands
Hong Kong footballers
Hong Kong international footballers
English footballers
English emigrants to Hong Kong
Association football forwards
Hong Kong people of English descent
Hong Kong people of Scottish descent
English people of Scottish descent
Hong Kong FC players
Kitchee SC players
Eastern Sports Club footballers
Southern District FC players
TSW Pegasus FC players
Hong Kong First Division League players
Hong Kong Premier League players
People with acquired permanent residency of Hong Kong
Naturalized footballers of Hong Kong
Alumni of King George V School, Hong Kong